The Bethylidae are a family of aculeate wasps in the superfamily Chrysidoidea. As a family, their biology ranges between parasitoid wasps and hunting wasps.

Overview
Like most of the Chrysidoidea, the Bethylidae are stinging Hymenoptera and most are parasitoids. Some of them, however, have developed their parasitoidal biology along predatory lines and they sting and malaxate their victims into paralysis. Then they hide the prey and lay their eggs on them.

According to Azevedo et al. (2018) eight subfamilies of the Bethylidae are recognized:

Pristocerinae
Epyrinae
Mesitiinae
Bethylinae
Scleroderminae
†Lancepyrinae
†Protopristocerinae
†Holopsenellinae

Genera
According to Azevedo et al. (2018) there are 96 genera belong to the family Bethylidae. Some are listed here:

 Afrobethylus Ramos & Azevedo g
 Afrocera Benoit, 1983 g
 Allepyris Kieffer, 1905 g
 Allobethylus Kieffer, 1905 g
 Anaylax Moczar, 1970 g
 Anisepyris Kieffer, 1906 g b
 Anisobrachium Kieffer, 1905 g
 Apenesia Westwood, 1874 g b
 Archaeopristocera Terayama, 2004 g
 Archaepyris Evans, 1973 g
 Aspidepyris Evans, 1964 g
 Ateleopterus Förster, 1856 g
 Australomesitius Barbosa & Azevedo g
 Bethylitella Cockerell, 1917 g
 Bethylopsis Fouts, 1939 g
 Bethylopteron Brues, 1933 g
 Bethylus Latreille, 1802 g b
 Caloapenesia Terayama, 1995 g
 Calobrachium Gobbi & Azevedo, 2016 g
 Calyozina Enderlein, 1912 g
 Celonophamia Evans, 1973 g
 Cephalonomia Westwood, 1833 i c g b
 Chilepyris Evans, 1964 c g
 Chlorepyris b (chlorepyris)
 Clytrovorus Nagy, 1972 g
 Codorcas Nagy, 1972 g
 Cretabythus Evans, 1973 g
 Cretepyris Ortega-Blanco & Engel, 2013 g
 Cretobethylellus Rasnitsyn, 1990 g
 Dissomphalus Ashmead, 1893 g b
 Elektroepyris Perrichot & Nel, 2008 g
 Epyris Westwood, 1874 g b
 Eupsenella Westwood, 1874 c g
 Foenobethylus Kieffer, 1913 g
 Formosiepyris Terayama, 2004 g
 Glenosema Kieffer, 1905 g
 Goniozus Förster, 1856 c g b
 Heterocoelia Dahlbom, 1854 g
 Holepyris Kieffer, 1904 g b
 Israelius Richards, 1952 g
 Itapayos Argaman, 2003 g
 Laelius Ashmead, 1893 g b
 †Lancepyris Azevedo & Azar, 2012 g
 Lithobiocerus Bridwell, 1919 g
 Liztor Ortega-Blanco & Engel, 2013 g
 Lytopsenella Kieffer, 1911 g
 Megaprosternum Azevedo, 2006 g
 Mesitius Spinola, 1851 g
 Metrionotus Moczar, 1970 g
 Moczariella Barbosa & Azevedo, 2014 g
 Odontepyris Kieffer, 1904 g
 Parapristocera Brues, 1933 g
 Pararhabdepyris Gorbatovsky, 1995 g
 Parascleroderma Kieffer, 1904 g
 Pilomesitius Moczar, 1970 g
 Plastanoxus Kieffer, 1905 g
 Pristocera Klug, 1808 g b
 Pristepyris Kieffer, 1905 g b
 Prorops Waterston, 1923 g
 Prosierola Kieffer, 1905 g
 †Protopristocera Brues, 1923 g
 Pseudisobrachium Kieffer, 1904 g b
 Psilobethylus Kieffer, 1906 g
 Pycnomesitius Moczar, 1971 g
 Rhabdepyris Kieffer, 1904 g
 Sclerodermus Latreille, 1809 g b
 Sierola Cameron, 1881 g
 Sulcomesitius Moczar, 1970 g
 Trichiscus Benoit, 1956 g
 Tuberepyris Lanes & Azevedo, 2008 g
 Zimankos Argaman, 2003 g
Data sources: i = ITIS, c = Catalogue of Life, g = GBIF, b = Bugguide.net

Evolution 
The oldest known records of the group are from the Barremian aged Lebanese amber.

References

Chrysidoidea
Apocrita families